The Mookervaart River (Mookervaart Canal; also written in Indonesian as Mokervart) is a canal connecting the Cisadane River in Tangerang and Kali Angke (Angke River) in Jakarta. Constructed from 1678 to 1689, this 25–30 meter wide channel is one of the important flood control water channels in Jakarta.

History

The Mookervaart was originally constructed in 1678 to 1689 to draw one third the water flow from the Cisadane River, and link to the city canals of Batavia, to control the flood. In 1732 Governor General Diederik Durven ordered the canal to be dug deeper to bring more water to the city, but this created stagnant pools that brought deathly illness, such as malaria, increasing the mortality. Furthermore, the canal also swells very high during the rainy season, so a lock was built at the upper end of the river in 1770. Nonetheless, the Mookervaart still supplied the most water to Batavia in the 18th century.

Hydrology
The average daily rainfall is 132 mm, with the peak debit at 125 m³.

Geography
The river flows in the northwest area of Java with predominantly tropical rainforest climate (designated as Af in the Köppen-Geiger climate classification). The annual average temperature in the area is 27 °C. The warmest month is March, when the average temperature is around 30 °C, and the coldest is May, at 26 °C. The average annual rainfall is 3674 mm. The wettest month is December, with an average of 456 mm rainfall, and the driest is September, with 87 mm rainfall.

Historic place
Fort Anké was built by the Dutch East India Company in 1657 at the intersection of the Mookervaart channel (Mookervaart River) and Angke River. Historical names for the fort include Anckee, Anke, and Ankee.

See also
 List of rivers of Java

References

Rivers of Jakarta
Rivers of Indonesia